Alf Griffiths was an Australian rugby league footballer who played in the 1930s who played for Newtown in the NSWRL competition as a centre.

Playing career
Griffiths made his first grade debut in 1932 against University.  

The following year, Griffiths was a member of the Newtown side which claimed its second premiership defeating St George 18–5 at the Sydney Sports Ground with Griffiths scoring 2 tries.  
ut to play
This would be the last game that Griffiths played for the club as he departed at the end of the year and moved out to captain/coach Queanbeyan .

References

External links

Australian rugby league players
Newtown Jets players
Rugby league centres
Rugby league players from Sydney
Year of birth missing
Year of death missing
Place of birth missing
Place of death missing